The Jyrgalang is a river in Kyrgyzstan. It takes its rise on the north slopes of Teskey Ala-Too range and flows into Issyk-Kul lake. The villages Jyrgalang and Ak-Suu are located near the river. With its , the river is second longest river of the Issyk-Kul basin.

References

Rivers of Kyrgyzstan
Tian Shan
Tributaries of Issyk-Kul